KKE stands for Κομμουνιστικό Κόμμα Ελλάδας (Kommounistikó Kómma Elládas), the Communist Party of Greece.

KKE may also refer to:
 KKE Architects, a former architecture firm in the United States
 Añorga KKE, a sports and culture club in Spain
 Kakabe language of Guinea (ISO code: kke)
 KKE, the IATA code for the Kerikeri Airport in New Zealand